The 11th Toronto International Film Festival (TIFF) took place in Toronto, Ontario, Canada between September 4 and September 13, 1986. The Decline of the American Empire by Denys Arcand was selected as the opening film. It won People's Choice Award at the festival and later got nominated for Best Foreign Language Film at Oscars.

Awards

Programme

Gala Presentation
Blue Velvet by David Lynch
Down by Law by Jim Jarmusch
Man Facing Southeast by Eliseo Subiela
The Legend of Suram Fortress by Sergei Parajanov & Dodo Abashidze
River's Edge by Tim Hunter
Thérèse by Alain Cavalier
A Zed & Two Noughts by Peter Greenaway
'night, Mother by Tom Moore
Malcolm by Nadia Tass
My Life as a Dog by Lasse Hallström
Come and See by Elem Klimov
Children of a Lesser God by Randa Haines
Golden Eighties by Chantal Akerman 
Hour of the Star by Suzana Amaral
The Sacrifice by Andrei Tarkovsky
Alpine Fire by Fredi M. Murer
Speriamo che sia femmina by Mario Monicelli
Men... by Doris Dörrie
Shadey by Philip Saville

Canadian Perspective
The Adventure of Faustus Bidgood by Andy Jones and Michael Jones
Anne Trister by Léa Pool
The Climb by Donald Shebib
Close to Home by Rick Beairsto
Confidential by Bruce Pittman
Dancing in the Dark by Leon Marr
The Decline of the American Empire by Denys Arcand
Evixion by Bashar Shbib
The Final Battle by Donald Brittain
Intimate Power (Pouvoir intime) by Yves Simoneau
Loyalties by Anne Wheeler
Overnight by Jack Darcus
Passiflora by Fernand Bélanger and Dagmar Teufal
Richard Cardinal: Cry from a Diary of a Métis Child by Alanis Obomsawin
Sitting in Limbo by John N. Smith
Welcome to the Parade by Stuart Clarfield

Documentaries
Sherman's March by Ross McElwee

References

External links
 Official site
 TIFF: A Reel History: 1976 - 2012
1986 Toronto International Film Festival at IMDb

1986
1986 film festivals
1986 in Toronto
1986 in Canadian cinema